Micropterix berytella is a species of moth belonging to the family Micropterigidae, which is endemic to Israel. It was described by Joseph de Joannis in 1886.

Adults are important pollinators of  Persian cyclamen (Cyclamen persicum). The anther structure with channeled stamens of this plant, is suitable for buzz-pollination by bees. However, this is seldom observed. It might be that the plant coevolved originally with a large bee which performed buzz-pollination and is now extinct. The vacant flower's niche is now occupied by Micropterix berytella. The plant supplies food, shelter, and a site for mating and laying eggs in a way that suits the size, senses, mouth structure organs and life cycle of the species.

References 

Micropterigidae
Endemic fauna of Israel
Moths described in 1886
Moths of the Middle East
Taxa named by Joseph de Joannis